João Rodrigues da Câmara (c.1460 – 1502), son of Rui Gonçalves da Câmara, who became the second Captain-Donatário of the island of São Miguel.

Biography

Early life
He was married to Inês da Câmara, lady-in-waiting to Infanta Beatrice, Duchess of Viseu, who had a good relation in the Portuguese Court. Firstborn son of Rui Gonçalves da Câmara, he was in Lisbon completing his education, while his brother was a novice at the Monastery of Alcobaça, indicating the importance of the family within the Portuguese Court at the time.

Donatário
João Rodrigues followed his father's policy of attracting settlers to the islands of the Azores. He invited many people from the kingdom, those with a spirit of adventure, that included many of the prominent families in the modern archipelago, including the Monizes, Baretos, Baldaias, Vaz, Sousas, Esteves, Rochas, Machados, Costas and Benevides.

Later life
João Rodrigues' tenure was short (1497–1502), when died suddenly in Lisbon, leaving behind his wife on the island of São Miguel, along with his four minor children. Following his death, the Captania of São Miguel was assumed (unofficially) by his brother Pedro Rodrigues da Câmara, until his son Rui Gonçalves da Câmara obtained age of majority. During Pedro's administration various Jewish families came to the Azores, after being expelled in 1497 from the continent (the document was only published four years later).

References
Notes

Sources
 

1460 births
1502 deaths
Camara Joao Rodrigos
15th-century Portuguese people
16th-century Portuguese people
Gonçalves da Câmara family